Sueviota  bryozophila the bryozoan goby, is a species of fish in the family Gobiidae. found in Indonesia.This species reaches a length of .

References

bryozophila
Taxa named by Gerald R. Allen
Taxa named by Mark van Nydeck Erdmann
Taxa named by Ni Kadek Dita Cahyani
Fish described in 2016